Elizabeth Barton (1506 – 20 April 1534), known as "The Nun of Kent", "The Holy Maid of London", "The Holy Maid of Kent" and later "The Mad Maid of Kent", was an English Catholic nun. She was executed as a result of her prophecies against the marriage of King Henry VIII of England to Anne Boleyn.

Early life
Little is known about Barton's early life.  She was born in 1506 in the parish of Aldington, about 12 miles from Canterbury, and she appears to have come from a poor background.  She was working as a servant in 1525 when she said her visions began.

Visions
On Easter of 1525, at the age of 19, while working as a domestic servant in the household of Thomas Cobb, a farmer of Aldington, Barton suffered from a severe illness and claimed to have received divine revelations that predicted events, such as the death of a child living in her household or, more frequently, pleas for people to remain in the Catholic Church. She urged people to pray to the Virgin Mary and to undertake pilgrimages. Thousands believed in her prophecies and both Archbishop William Warham and Bishop John Fisher attested to her pious life.

When some events that Barton foretold apparently occurred, her reputation spread. Barton's revelations became publicly known and matters were brought up by Archbishop William Warham. The parish priest, Richard Masters, duly referred the matter to Warham, who appointed a commission to ensure that none of her prophecies was at variance with Catholic teaching. This commission was led by the Benedictine monk, Edward Bocking, Barton's spiritual advisor. When the commission decided favourably, Warham arranged for Barton to be received in the Benedictine St Sepulchre's Priory, Canterbury, under Bocking’s spiritual direction.

Barton's life became very public; nothing unorthodox was found in her case; her alleged public healing from the Virgin Mary at Court-at-Street increased attention and gave fame to her and to the Marian Shrine. 

In 1527 Robert Redman published A marueilous woorke of late done at Court of Streete in Kent which discussed all of Barton's "miracles, revelations, and prophecies" and the controversies leading up to the arrests and executions.

In 1528, Barton held a private meeting with Cardinal Thomas Wolsey, the second most powerful man in England after Henry VIII, and she soon thereafter met twice with Henry himself. Henry accepted Barton because her prophecies then still supported the existing order. She also consulted with Richard Reynolds, a Bridgettine monk of Syon Abbey. He arranged a meeting between Barton and Thomas More, who was impressed by her fervour. Her prophecies warned against heresy and condemned rebellion at a time when Henry was attempting to stamp out Lutheranism and was afraid of possible uprising or even assassination by his enemies.

However, when the King began the process of obtaining an annulment of his marriage to Catherine of Aragon and seizing control of the Church in England from Rome, Barton opposed him. Barton strongly opposed the English Reformation and, in around 1532, began prophesying that if Henry remarried, he would die within a few months. She said that she had even seen the place in Hell to which he would go. Thomas More thought many prophesies were fictitiously attributed to her, and King Henry actually lived for a further 15 years. Remarkably, probably because of her popularity, Barton went unpunished for nearly a year. More, Reynolds & Fisher all warned her against ‘political’ statements and distanced themselves from her. The King's agents spread rumours that she was engaged in sexual relationships with priests and that she suffered from mental illness.

Arrest and execution
With her reputation undermined, the Crown arrested Barton in 1533 and forced her to confess that she had fabricated her revelations. What is known regarding her confession comes from Thomas Cromwell, his agents and other sources affiliated with the Crown.

Friar John Laurence of the Observant Friars of Greenwich gave evidence against Barton and against fellow Observants, Friars Hugh Rich and Richard Risby. Laurence then requested to be named to one of the posts left vacant by their imprisonment. She was condemned by a bill of attainder (25 Henry VIII, c. 12); an Act of Parliament authorizing punishment without trial.

Barton was attainted for treason by Parliamentary Act, on the basis that she had maliciously opposed Henry VIII's divorce from Catherine of Aragon, and had prophesied that the King would lose his kingdom. Although Barton claimed God had revealed to her that he no longer recognized Henry VIII's monarchy, the Act of Attainder argued that Barton was at the centre of a conspiracy against the King. Barton was viewed as a false prophet who was encouraged to profess fake revelations to persuade others to go against the monarchy.

On 20 April 1534 Elizabeth Barton was hanged at Tyburn for treason. She was 28 years old. Five of her chief supporters were executed alongside her:

Edward Bocking, Benedictine monk of Christ Church, Canterbury
John Dering, Benedictine monk
Henry Gold, priest
Hugh Rich, Franciscan friar
Richard Risby, Franciscan friar

Barton was buried at Greyfriars Church in Newgate, but her head was put on a spike on London Bridge. She is the only woman in history to receive that dishonour.

Legacy
Churches such as the Anglican Catholic Church of St Augustine of Canterbury continue to venerate Barton.

Popular culture
Barton's case is dealt with in the 2009 historical novel Wolf Hall by Hilary Mantel, and in its television adaptation, where she is played by Aimee-Ffion Edwards. Barton and her prophecies are also mentioned in Philippa Gregory's 2014 novel The King's Curse; the sixth and final book in The Cousins' War series.

Barton is personally interrogated by Thomas Cromwell, Thomas Cranmer and Nicòla Frescobaldi in Shaking the Throne by author Caroline Angus.

In the play A Man for All Seasons by Robert Bolt, Barton is referenced during the interrogation of Thomas More as having been executed (she was executed about 15 months before More).

References

Bibliography
 .
 .
 .
 .

External links

 .
 

1500s births
1534 deaths
16th-century English nuns
16th-century Roman Catholic martyrs
Executed English women
People executed by the Kingdom of England by hanging
People executed under Henry VIII
People executed under the Tudors for treason against England
People executed at Tyburn